Zhu Zhihong (November 1933 – 20 December 2022) was a Chinese politician, and the former chairman of the Jiangxi Provincial Committee of the Chinese People's Political Consultative Conference (CPPCC).

Biography
A native of Jiangning, Jiangsu, Zhu was appointed chairman of the Jiangxi Provincial Discipline Inspection Commission in 1985.

In 1991, he became Deputy Party Committee Secretary of Jiangxi. In 1994, Zhu became Jiangxi CPPCC chairman.

In 2022, Zhihong died from COVID-19.

References 

1933 births
2022 deaths
Deputy Communist Party secretaries of Jiangxi
CPPCC Committee Chairmen of Jiangxi
Members of the 9th Chinese People's Political Consultative Conference
Members of the 10th Chinese People's Political Consultative Conference
Delegates to the 8th National People's Congress
Deaths from the COVID-19 pandemic in China